Patissa coenicosta is a moth in the family Crambidae. It was described by Joseph de Joannis in 1930. It is found in China (Guangdong) and Vietnam.

Subspecies
Patissa coenicosta coenicosta (Vietnam)
Patissa coenicosta sinensis (Caradja in Caradja & Meyrick, 1933) (China)

References

Moths described in 1930
Schoenobiinae